Albert Smith (January 30, 1929 - June 24, 1985) was an American racing driver from Dayton, Ohio who competed in the USAC Championship Car series.

While he drove in numerous races on pavement, he only attempted the Indianapolis 500 once in 1967 and failed to make the field.  He made 14 Champ Car starts from 1966 to 1969. His best finish was 5th place in his first Champ Car start in 1966 at the Atlanta Motor Speedway.

References

1929 births
1985 deaths
Racing drivers from Dayton, Ohio